Thomas Jacobsen (born 4 November 1987) is a Norwegian ice sledge hockey player.

He took the bronze medal with the Norwegian sledge hockey team at the 2010 Winter Paralympics in Vancouver, British Columbia, Canada.

References

External links 
 

1987 births
Living people
Paralympic sledge hockey players of Norway
Norwegian sledge hockey players
Ice sledge hockey players at the 2010 Winter Paralympics
Paralympic bronze medalists for Norway
Medalists at the 2010 Winter Paralympics
Paralympic medalists in sledge hockey
Sportspeople from Fredrikstad